Jessica Sonpong Espiner (born 22 February 1997), or nickname ""Jess"" Miss Grand Bangkok 2017 is a Thai actress on CH7HD.

Early life 
Jessica Sonpong Espiner (born 22 February 1997), or nickname ""Jess"" Miss Grand Bangkok 2017 is a Thai actress on Channel 7 (Thailand).

Pageantry

Miss Grand Thailand 2017 
Jessica won Miss Grand Bangkok 2017 and represent Bangkok at Miss Grand Thailand, She was place at top 12 Miss Grand Thailand 2019 and won Miss Grand Rising Star contract an actress at CH7HD  </ref>

Filmography

Tv Series 
Drama
 2017, Passion DIARY, Role Feara
 2018, LOVE COMPLEX, Role  Je
 2018, Kluen Pee Puan, Role LookPaer
 2018, MaeSueParkRai PooChaiRosJad, Role Panita or Nita
 2020, Roi-Pa, Role SaengThong 
 2022, My Lovely Bodyguard , Role Prima

Movie
2561  KhunBunLue Role Tharin

Host 
 Tieng Bunterng

References

External links 
 

Jessica Sompong Espiner
Living people
1997 births
Jessica Sompong Espiner
Jessica Sompong Espiner